Sanvir Singh (born 12 October 1996) is an Indian cricketer. He made his List A debut for Punjab in the 2018–19 Vijay Hazare Trophy on 28 September 2018. He made his first-class debut for Punjab in the 2018–19 Ranji Trophy on 1 November 2018, scoring a century in the first innings. In November 2019, he was named in India's squad for the 2019 ACC Emerging Teams Asia Cup in Bangladesh. He made his Twenty20 debut on 4 November 2021, for Punjab in the 2021–22 Syed Mushtaq Ali Trophy.

References

External links
 

1996 births
Living people
Indian cricketers
Punjab, India cricketers
Place of birth missing (living people)